Rebecca Ann Jarvis (born September 28, 1981) is an American journalist and former investment banker. She is the chief business, economics, and technology correspondent for ABC News, the host, creator, and managing editor of Real Biz with Rebecca Jarvis and the host of the podcasts No Limits with Rebecca Jarvis and The Dropout. She was a finalist on Season 4 of The Apprentice.

Early life
Jarvis is a daughter of Gail (née Marks) Jarvis and James T. Jarvis. Her father is a lawyer and business consultant in Chicago. Her mother is the Chicago Tribunes nationally syndicated financial columnist. Jarvis graduated from St. Paul Academy and Summit School in 1999 and the University of Chicago in 2003, studying economics and Law, Letters, and Society.  She studied international economics and business in Paris at Sciences Po and Paris Dauphine University.

Jarvis was one of Teen Peoples "20 Teens Who Will Change the World" in February 2000.  She was honored for raising over $750,000 for her own non-profit children's charity - a project that also involved Al Gore and Colin Powell, which she set up at 15. She was also named as a "Point of Light" for her advocacy of disenfranchised children and teens. During high school, Jarvis worked with the National Youth Leadership Council on their Youth Project Team, getting one of the few interviews granted by then Secretary of State Colin Powell while serving as an NYLC Youth Reporter at National Youth Summits.

The Apprentice
On the second week of The Apprentice 4, Jarvis broke her ankle while playing hockey as a task-winning reward. She was on crutches for the rest of the competition, which took 39 days to tape in the spring of 2005, but was fully able to walk by the time of the live season finale seven months later. On the season finale of the show, Randal Pinkett was hired. Donald Trump asked Pinkett if he should hire Jarvis as well; Pinkett replied that he should be the only Apprentice since he was the winner.

Professional career
Jarvis was a short-term interest rate trader on Citigroup's foreign exchange desk in London. She later worked at Banc of America Securities in Chicago as an investment banking analyst.

Jarvis has worked in both investment banking and foreign currency trading, but left financial services to pursue a career in journalism. She has written for publications including Crain's Chicago Business and Business 2.0. She is currently a governor on the board of the Society of American Business Editors and Writers.

On March 7, 2006, the business news channel CNBC announced it would be hiring Jarvis as an associate reporter. She was a general assignment reporter based at CNBC's world headquarters, and covered NASDAQ and the NYMEX. She last appeared on CNBC on September 18, 2009. On October 21, 2009, TVNewser quoted CNBC spokesman Brian Steel as confirming that "Rebecca is no longer with CNBC, and we wish her the best."

Jarvis joined CBS News, primarily as a financial reporter, starting on April 1, 2010, and later became the co-anchor of CBS This Morning Saturday, as well as Business and Economics Correspondent for CBS News. On the March 30, 2013, broadcast of CBS This Morning Saturday, she announced that she was leaving CBS News, but did not say where she was going. On April 2, it was announced she was joining ABC News later that month. She has worked as the Chief Business and Economics Correspondent of ABC since.

Currently Jarvis is the Chief Business, Technology and Economics Correspondent for ABC News and the Host, Creator and Managing Editor of Real Biz with Rebecca Jarvis. She reports for all ABC News programs and platforms including Good Morning America, ABC World News Tonight, Nightline, 20/20, and This Week with George Stephanopoulos.

In 2017 Jarvis launched a new podcast with ABC News Radio, No Limits with Rebecca Jarvis. In January 2019, Jarvis, in conjunction with ABC Radio and ABC Nightline, became the host of a podcast called "The Dropout" which documents the rise and fall of Theranos and Elizabeth Holmes.

Recognition

Personal life
Jarvis married Matthew Hanson on January 28, 2012 at McNamara Alumni Center in Minnesota. Rabbi Barry Axler officiated the ceremony with the bridegroom’s father, the Rev. Craig Hanson, the lead pastor at Roseville Lutheran Church in Roseville, Minnesota, taking part. They are both graduates of University of Chicago and worked together at Bank of America Securities in Chicago. They have a daughter, born on February 20, 2019.

References

External links 
Interview with Rebecca Jarvis by Minneapolis St. Paul Magazine
"Rebecca Jarvis joins CNBC Business Day as an Associate Reporter", 7 March 2006

realbiz with Rebecca Jarvis on ABC News
ABC Radio announces new podcast 'No limits with Rebecca Jarvis'
http://abcn.ws/nolimits

1981 births
ABC News personalities
American business and financial journalists
American currency traders
American expatriates in France
American financial analysts
American financial businesspeople
American investment bankers
American reporters and correspondents
American women in business
American women television journalists
Bank of America people
Businesspeople from Chicago
Businesspeople from Minnesota
CBS News people
Citigroup employees
CNBC people
Jewish American journalists
Journalists from Illinois
Journalists from Minnesota
Living people
Sciences Po alumni
University of Chicago alumni
University of Paris alumni
Women financial analysts
Writers from Chicago
Writers from Minneapolis
American women podcasters
American podcasters
Women business and financial journalists
The Apprentice (franchise) contestants
Participants in American reality television series
21st-century American Jews
21st-century American women
Managing editors